Gateway often refers to:

A gate or portal

Gateway or The Gateway may also refer to:

Arts and entertainment

Films
 Gateway (film), a 1938 drama
 The Gateway (2015 film), a horror film
 The Gateway (2017 film), a science-fiction film
 The Gateway (2021 film), a crime thriller

Music
 Gateway (band), a jazz trio featuring John Abercrombie, Jack DeJohnette, and Dave Holland
 Gateway (Gateway album) (1976)
 Gateway (Bongzilla album)
 Gateway, an album by Erik Wøllo

Other arts and entertainment
 Gateway (novel), a 1977 novel by Frederik Pohl
 Gateway (computer game), two adventure games based on the novel
 Gateway (comics), a supporting character in Marvel's X-Men series
 Gateway (video game), an interactive fiction game
 Gateway Galaxy, a galaxy in the video game Super Mario Galaxy
 Gateway, a British science-fiction imprint owned by Victor Gollancz Ltd
 Getaway, a 2014 four-issue comic book limited series published by IDW Publishing

Buildings
 The Gateway, Nantwich, England
 The Gateway, Hong Kong, Tsim Sha Tsui, Kowloon, Hong Kong, a shopping centre
 The Gateway, Singapore, a twin-building office complex
 Gateway Theatre of Shopping, a shopping centre in uMhlanga, South Africa
 Westfield Gateway, an enclosed shopping mall in Lincoln, Nebraska, United States
 The Gateway (New Brunswick, New Jersey), New Jersey, United States
 The Gateway (Salt Lake City), Salt Lake City, Utah, United States, a residential, retail and office complex
 Gateway Sports and Entertainment Complex, a stadium complex in Cleveland, Ohio, United States
 Gateway Center (disambiguation)
 Gateway Mall (disambiguation)
 Gateway Theatre (disambiguation)
 Gateway Tower (disambiguation)

Companies
 Gateway, Inc., a computer manufacturer
 Gateway Newstands, a Canadian convenience store chain
 Gateway Supermarket, a former UK supermarket chain rebranded as Somerfield in the 1990s

Places in the United States
 Gateway, Alaska, a census-designated place
 Gateway, Arkansas, a town
 Gateway, Los Angeles County, California, a place in California
 Gateway, Nevada County, California, an unincorporated community
 Gateway, San Diego, California, a neighborhood of San Diego
 Gateway, Colorado, an unincorporated community
 Gateway, Florida, a census-designated place
 Gateway, Camden, a neighborhood of Camden, New Jersey
 Gateway, Oregon, an unincorporated community
 Gateway National Recreation Area, parks and beaches in New York City and New Jersey
 Gateway Region, the most urbanized part of northeastern New Jersey

Schools in the United States
 Gateway Regional High School (Massachusetts)
 Gateway Academy (Laredo, Texas), a charter high school in Laredo, Texas
 Gateway Academy, Scottsdale, a private special school in Scottsdale, Arizona

Sports
 Gateway International Raceway, a racetrack in Madison, Illinois, United States
 Gateway Collegiate Athletic Conference, a women's sports conference that operated from 1983 to 1992 before being absorbed by the Missouri Valley Conference
 Gateway Football Conference, a college football league now known as the Missouri Valley Football Conference

Technology
 Gateway (telecommunications), a network node equipped for interfacing with another network that uses different communication protocols
 Gateway (web page), a web page designed to attract visitors and search engines to a particular website
 Gateway Technology, a cloning system in molecular biology
 Lunar Gateway, a planned moon orbit space station
 Gateway 3DS, a flash cartridge for the Nintendo 3DS; see Nintendo 3DS storage devices

Transportation
 Gateway Bridge (disambiguation)
 Gateway Motorway, a motorway in Brisbane
 Gateway Boulevard, a major street in Edmonton, Alberta, Canada
 Gateway Transportation Center, a rail and bus terminal station in downtown St. Louis, Missouri
 Gateway station (disambiguation)
 Gateway Project, a rail expansion project between New York City and Newark, New Jersey

Other uses
 The Gateway (student magazine), the student magazine at the University of Alberta, Canada
 The Gateway (student newspaper), a UK student business and careers newspaper
 Greater Vancouver Gateway Program, an infrastructure project for Greater Vancouver

See also

 Gateway Arch, St. Louis, Missouri, United States
 Gateway Church (disambiguation)
 Gateway drug theory, a hypothesis on drug use
 Gateways (disambiguation)